Route 238 is a numbered state highway running  in Newport, Rhode Island. Its southern terminus is at Goat Island Road in Newport, and its northern terminus is at Route 138 in Newport.

Route description
Route 238 is a spur from Route 138 providing access to Goat Island and Newport. It begins at the intersection of the Newport Bridge Access Road and J.T. Connell Highway, and runs south along J.T. Connell Highway, Farewell Street, and America's Cup Avenue. It then turns to follow Gladys Carr Bolhouse Road, while Route 138A continues to follow America's Cup Blvd into central Newport. RI 238 crosses Newport Harbor to enter Goat Island, and quickly terminates at Goat Island Road.

Major intersections

References

External links

2019 Highway Map, Rhode Island

238
Transportation in Newport County, Rhode Island